The Philippine House Committee on Public Accounts, or House Public Accounts Committee is a standing committee of the Philippine House of Representatives.

Jurisdiction 
As prescribed by House Rules, the committee's jurisdiction is on the scrutiny and examination of audit reports on the government agencies' performance to determine their compliance or adherence to the plans and program authorized through the appropriation approved by the Congress.

Members, 18th Congress

Historical members

18th Congress

Chairperson 
 Michael Defensor (ANAKALUSUGAN) September 30, 2019 – December 16, 2020

See also 
 House of Representatives of the Philippines
 List of Philippine House of Representatives committees

References

External links 
House of Representatives of the Philippines

Public Accounts